Elizabeth N. Saunders is an American political scientist. She is associate professor in the School of Foreign Service at Georgetown University. She is an editor of The Washington Post's Monkey Cage blog. She is known for her research on international relations and foreign policy, in particular examining the domestic politics of U.S. foreign policy, and the foreign policy behavior of leaders.

References

External links 

American political scientists
American women political scientists
Living people
Year of birth missing (living people)
21st-century American women